Amreli is a city and a municipality in Amreli district in Indian state of Gujarat.

History
It is believed that during 534 AD Amreli existed was formerly known as Anumanji, Amlik and then Amravati. The city is named in ancient Gujrati as Amarvalli. It is learnt from the inscription that Nagnath temple that ancient name of Amreli city was Amarpalli. It was also called Girvanvalli. Amongst the remains of the ancient town are the memorial stones or paliyas and foundations discovered in the fork of the Thebi and Vari rivers, and two old temples, Kamnath and Trimbaknath, on the west and east of the river.

In the eighteenth century only the west and south of modern Amreli, still called Juni or Old Amreli, were inhabited. The old inner fort, called Juna Kot, was used as a jail, and the Juna Masjid near it, belong to the old town. Modern Amreli dates from 1793, when Vakhatsingh of Bhavnagar sacked the neighboring Kathi possession of Chital and drove many of its people to Amreli and Jetpur.

Initially Amreli was the part of the former Gaekwad of Vadodara. Very little information on historical background is available for Amreli District prior to becoming part of erstwhile Baroda State.

When Damajirao Gaekwad, the Maratha general, came to Kathiawad in about 1730, three parties viz Kathis of Devalia carter, some Saiyads holding major part of Amreli. Obtained for the king of Delhi, and Faujdar of Junagadh, subordinate to suba of Ahmedabad, held sway. Damajirao and the Maratha forces defeated all three and levied tribute on all of them. Later Damajirao Gaekwad, established military camps at Amreli and Lathi in 1742–43 A.D. In 1800, the then Gaekwads appointed (1810–1815) Vithalrao Devaji (Dighe/Kathewad Diwanji) as Sar Subah of the Gaekwad's Kathiawad possessions. Vithalrao Devaji settled in Amreli and developed the city and its surrounding regions over the next 23 years. It was during this period that Amreli became a proper city. He built many works of public utility; among others, temples, offices, a market, and a dam for the water-supply of the town. It was under Amreli-Okhamandal division, one of four divisions of Baroda State.

During the Gaekwad regime in 1886, compulsory and free education policy was adopted in Amreli for the first time. After Indian independence in 1947, the district became the part of Saurashtra State which was later merged with Bombay State in 1956. After bifurcation of Bombay State in 1960 into Gujarat and Maharashtra, it became part of Gujarat under Amreli district.

Climate

Attractions
Most part of the commercial area is called Tower Road stretching from Tower to the Main Bus stand and further to Gopi Cinema.
 Nagnath Temple (built by Vithalrao Devaji)
 Shree Swaminarayan Mahila Sanskar Kendra
Balaji Hanuman Temple
 Rokadiya Hanuman Temple
 Gebansha Peer Dargah
 Kamnath & Mahadev Temple
 Tower of Amreli
 Swaminarayan Temple
 Trimandir - This temple concept was developed by Param Pujya Dada Bhagwan. Within the temple a tall and attractive idol of Shree Simandhar Swami resides. 
 Dwarkadhish Haveli
 Jafari Mazaar (Bohra Dargah of Jafarji Moala)
 Siddhi Vinayak Temple
 Guru Datta Temple
 Sai Baba Temple (Sardarnagar)
 Gayatri Temple
 Sukhnath Mahadev Temple
 Rameshwar mahadev Temple
 Mahatma Muldas Bapu Dham
 Jivan Mukteshwar Temple
 Balaji Hanumanji (Rangpur Road)
 Palace of King
 Shri Girdharilal Sangrahalaya Children Museum and Computer Education Centre (E-Library)
 Gandhi Baugh (Gandhi Garden)
 Kailash Muktidham
 Kamani Forward High School
 Kamani Science & Prataprai Arts College

Attractions (Surrounding Amreli)
 Tapasvini Pujya Vasant Didi Ashram, Liliya Mota 
 Shri Bhojalram Dham or Bhojaldham near Fatepur, located 7 km southerly to Amreli
 Pavan dham gaushala, Mota Ankadiya
 Garaneshvar Mahadev Temple, Garni
Mini kedariya of katrodi gam or village
 Hanumanji Temple, Charan Pipali.
 Bhurakhiya Hanuman Temple, Lathi
 Pania Wildlife Sanctuary, Dhari Gir
 Swaminarayan Gurukul, Taravada
 Dhari Khodiyar Dam 
Galadhara Khodiyar Mata Temple, Dhari
 Balmukund haveli, Dhari
 Dhari Gir National sanctuary, Dhari Gir
 Yogiji Temple, Dhari
 Dan gigave ashram and temple or Danevdham, Chalala
Shree balkrishnalallji ni haveli Babra
 Varhaswarup Temple, Jafrabad
 Sarkeshwar Mahadev Temple, Jafrabad
 Ratneshwar Mahadev Temple, Jafrabad
 Lunasapuriya Temple, Jafrabad
 Shiyal bet, Jafrabad
 Jafrabad Fort, Jafrabad
 Pipavav Port, Rajula
 Pipavav Dham, Rajula
 Ballad Mata Mandir, Rajula
 Chanch Bungalow, Rajula
 UltraTech Cement Factory, Rajula
 Sana Vakya Caves, Timbi
 Hanuman Gala, Khambha
 Pandav Kund, Babra
 Dadva Randal Mata Temple, Babra
 Varahi Mata Temple, Savarkundla
 Varudi Mata Temple, Amarpur (Varudi)
 There is a well near the Government offices, called Bakshi-kua from Nana Bakshi in the time of Vithalrao, who built it.
 The Mir Sahib's Haveli was erected about 1850 by Mir Sarfardz Ali; former manager of Amreli, for his own residence.

Notable people

 Bhoja Bhagat was a saint.
Yogiji Maharaj – Sadhu Gnãnjivandas (23 May 1892 – 23 January 1971), commonly known as Yogiji Maharaj, was a Hindu sadhu and guru who is recognized as the fourth spiritual successor to Swaminarayan by the Bochasanwasi Shri Akshar Purushottam
 Jivraj Narayan Mehta is first chief minister of newly formed Gujarat state
Ramesh Parekh, famous poet of Gujarat.
Ramesh Oza, is a Hindu preacher famous for Bhagwat Kathakar from a small village Devka near Rajula of Amreli district
Dilip Shanghvi, said to be 2nd richest person in India.
Toofan Rafai - Artist and painter specially known for his dye colours.
 Savji Dhanji Dholakia, the Indian diamond merchant from Surat and the founder of Hari Krishna Exports Pvt. Ltd., hails from Dudhala village.
Vasant Gajera, founder of Laxmi Diamond Group. 
K Lal Magician, a  magician born in Mavjinjava village, Amreli district.
Dina Pathak is famous Bollywood actress & president of National Federation of Indian Women.

Demographics
 India census, Amreli had a population of 90,243. Males constitute 52% of the population and females 48%. Amreli has an average literacy rate of 78%, higher than the national average of 59.5%; with 55% of the males and 45% of females literate. 10% of the population is under 6 years of age.

Area – 6,760 km².
District Population – 15,14,000
City Population – 2,75,000
Male Literacy – 81.82%
Female Literacy – 66.97%
Headquarters – Amreli
Talukas – 11
Villages – 595

Villages
 

Ghandla
Jalia
Shedubhar
Virpur(gadhiya)

References

External links
 aapduamreli.com - provide amreli news everyday 
 wahgujarat.com – "Gujarati Cyber Vishamo" view live "Gujarat Gaurav Divas Mahotsav – 2008" in Amreli
kunkavav.com – kunkavav.com 

 This article incorporates text from a publication now in the public domain: 

Cities and towns in Amreli district